The Florina pepper is a pepper cultivated in the northern Greek region of Western Macedonia and specifically in the wider area of Florina; for which it is named. It has a deep red color, and is shaped like a cow's horn. Initially the pepper has a green color, ripening into red, after the 15th of August. The red pepper is known in Greece for its rich sweet flavor, used in various Greek dishes and is exported in various canned forms abroad, usually hand-stripped, keeping the natural scents of pepper and topped with extra virgin olive oil, salt and vinegar.

History
The seed was brought from Brazil to the region in the 17th century, and cultivated by the locals in Florina, Prespes, Veroia, Aridaia, and Kozani but only in Florina its cultivation was successful, where it adapted to the climate and soil, and eventually the other regions stopped cultivating the pepper, leaving Florina as its sole producer. The pepper belongs to the capsicum genus of the nightshade family Solanaceae. Florina's red peppers were awarded the recognition of Protected Designation of Origin in 1994 by the World Trade Organization (WTO). Every year during the last days of August, in a small local village in Aetos, Florina a feast of peppers is held, including celebrations with music bands and cooked recipes, based on peppers which are offered to all the guests.

Cultivation
High productivity and adaptation of the plant can be achieved in efficient draining soils, full sunny locations and low winds for the protection of its branch and root sensitivity. The most convenient temperatures for its growth are between 20° to 26° Celsius during the mid day and 14° to 16° Celsius during the night. Their harvest takes up to 18 weeks, ripening to maturity after mid-August. A good quality, red pepper of Florina should be bright in color, thick, firm and sweet flavored. Its consumption should be avoided with the appearance of dullness, cracks or deterioration, which are factors of the vegetables reduction in quality.

Cooking and recipes
The red peppers of Florina are usually roasted and stuffed with different combinations of foods, as rice, meat, shrimps and feta cheese. These sweet peppers are used in sauces, salads, pasta, meat recipes or mashed, creating a pâté with traditional recipes. They can also be dried, canned, frozen and pickled, usually garnishing Greek salads. They can be roasted, sliced and served as an appetizer, by adding olive oil, garlic and sea salt.</ref> A well-known traditional recipe in Greece with stuffed peppers is Gemista.

See also
Bell peppers
Black peppers
Capsicum cultivars
Chili peppers
Pepperoncini

References

Chili peppers
Capsicum cultivars
Greek cuisine
Florina (regional unit)
Greek products with protected designation of origin
Greek Macedonian cuisine